Tadashi Sato (February 6, 1923 – June 4, 2005) was an American artist.  He was born in Kaupakalua on the Hawaiian island of Maui.  His father had been a pineapple laborer, merchant, and calligrapher, and Tadashi's grandfather was a sumi-e artist.

Biography 
In childhood, Tadashi studied Japanese sumi ink painting and calligraphy.  He served  in the 442nd Infantry Regiment as a language specialist during World War II and went on to attend Cannon School of Business in Honolulu.  He then pursued his interest in art at the Honolulu Museum of Art under the G.I. Bill with the precisionist painter Ralston Crawford, who was a visiting artist in residence.  In 1948 he went to New York to study at the Brooklyn Museum Art School, Pratt Institute and the New York School for Social Research.

Sato's break came while he was working as a security guard at the Museum of Modern Art in New York.  A friend, who had been working as a movie extra, introduced him to actors Charles Laughton and Burgess Meredith, who were both art collectors.  They visited Sato's apartment and bought several paintings.  Sato promptly called his boss at the museum to resign.

Between 1950 and 1960, he traveled back and forth between New York and Hawaii, exhibiting both in Hawaii and on the mainland.  In 1960, Tadashi, his wife Kiyoko and two children returned to the islands.  In 1965 Sato was honored by President Lyndon Johnson at the White House Festival of Arts, alongside Georgia O'Keeffe, Jackson Pollock and other American artists.  From 1960 until his death in 2005, he lived in Maui.  Along with Satoru Abe, Bumpei Akaji, Edmund Chung, Tetsuo Ochikubo, Jerry T. Okimoto, and James Park, Tadashi Sato was a member of the Metcalf Chateau, a group of seven Asian-American artists with ties to Honolulu.
 
Tadashi Sato is considered a member of the abstract expressionist movement.  He is known for his abstract and semi-abstract paintings, mosaics, and murals, some, such as Submerged Rocks,  inspired by the clear water of his native Hawaii.  His goal was to convey a sense of serenity, balance, light and space.  Tadashi's most famous work is Aquarius, a 36-foot circular mosaic on the floor of the atrium of the Hawaii State Capitol.  The piece depicts submerged rocks and water reflections.  The University of Iowa Stanley Museum of Art (Iowa City, IA), the Solomon R. Guggenheim Museum (New York City), the Hawaii State Art Museum, the Honolulu Museum of Art, the University of Arizona Museum of Art (Tucson, Arizona), the Whitney Museum of American Art (New York City) and Yale University Art Gallery are among the public collections holding works of Tadashi Sato.

References
 Clarke, Joan and Diane Dods, Artists/Hawaii, Honolulu, University of Hawaii Press, 1996, 80–85.
 Department of Education, State of Hawaii, Artists of Hawaii, Honolulu, Department of Education, State of Hawaii, 1985, pp. 39–46.
 Haar, Francis and Neogy, Prithwish, Artists of Hawaii: Nineteen Painters and Sculptors, University of Hawaii Press, 1974, 112–119.
 Hartwell, Patricia L. (editor), Retrospective 1967-1987, Hawaii State Foundation on Culture and the Arts, Honolulu, Hawaii, 1987, p. 61
 Jensen, James, Tadashi Sato, A Retrospective, Honolulu, The Contemporary Museum, Honolulu, 2002.
 International Art Society of Hawai'i, Kuilima Kākou, Hawai’i-Japan Joint Exhibition, Honolulu, International Art Society of Hawai'i, 2004, p. 42
 Morse, Marcia, Legacy: Facets of Island Modernism, Honolulu, Honolulu Academy of Arts, 2001, pp. 22, 76-81
 Radford, Georgia and Warren Radford, Sculpture in the Sun, Hawaii's Art for Open Spaces, University of Hawaii Press, 1978, 96.
 Sato, Tadashi, Sketchbook in Bamboo Ridge: Journal of Hawai'i Literature and Arts, Summer 1990, 72–77.
 Yoshihara, Lisa A., Collective Visions, 1967-1997, Hawaii State Foundation on Culture and the Arts, Honolulu, Hawaii, 1997, 46.
 Tadashi Sato: Remembering a Master Article about artist Maui No Ka 'Oi Magazine Vol.9 No.3 (Oct. 2005).

Footnotes

1923 births
2005 deaths
20th-century American painters
American male painters
21st-century American painters
Artists from Hawaii
American artists of Japanese descent
People from Maui
20th-century American male artists